Sauda is a municipality in Rogaland county, Norway. The administrative centre of the municipality is the town of Sauda, where most of the population lives. Other villages in the municipality include Saudasjøen and Amdal. Despite being in the northern part of the region of Ryfylke, Sauda participates in the Haugalandet Council and is under the jurisdiction of the Haugaland og Sunnhordland District Court.

The  municipality is the 197th largest by area out of the 356 municipalities in Norway. Sauda is the 190th most populous municipality in Norway with a population of 4,525.

The town of Sauda is the fifth largest town in Rogaland county with 4,254 inhabitants (2016), and the city center is home to Northern Europe's largest melting plant, Eramet Norway AS. The municipality is situated in the mountain valleys surrounding the Saudafjorden.

General information

The municipality of Sauda was established in 1842 when it was separated from the large municipality of Suldal. Initially, Sauda had a population of 1,584. The municipal boundaries have never changed.  The municipality declared the urban area of Sauda as a town in 1999.

Name
The municipality (originally the parish) is named after the old Sauda farm, since the first Sauda Church was built there. The farm is now part of the village of Saudasjøen. The name is the plural form of sauðr which means "spring" or "issue of water". Before 1918, the name was written as "Saude" or "Søvde".

Coat of arms
The coat of arms was granted on 14 May 1976. The arms show three, vertical, jagged, silver/white lines on a blue background. The jagged lines symbolically represent a river as a means for hydroelectricity. Historically, power was generated by watermills, providing a possibility for the development of an industry in the village. Presently, the power is used for melting metal ore in smelters in the municipality.

Churches
The Church of Norway has one parish within the municipality of Sauda. It is part of the Ryfylke prosti (deanery) in the Diocese of Stavanger.

History

Archaeological excavation in Saudasjøen shows that people have been living in Sauda since the latest Ice Age. In 1349, the Plague/Black Death wiped out about two-thirds of the population in Sauda, causing a decline in both population and economy. Despite this, the population was increasing during the medieval period, and a new type of industry started to grow. Along the fjord, the power from several waterfalls was used to build and run sawmills, and large-scale lumber production was started. People from all over the world, especially from the Netherlands, started to trade with the people of Sauda. This resulted in major ship traffic, giving impetus to further development of the villages and farms in Sauda.

By the end of the 19th century, a new type of adventure would change the lives of the inhabitants forever. The mining industry started in the mountains of Hellandsbygd, making Sauda a small industrial area and trading center for the surrounding region. In 1910, the American company Electric Furnace Company (EFP) began the construction of Europe's largest smelting plant here in Sauda. This could only be done because of the large number of waterfalls and rivers that made it possible to build power plants situated a short distance from the smelter, which uses large amounts of electricity.

Sauda's time as a farming village was now over, and the people of today still live on the foundation of the new town that emerged. By the end of World War II, the Germans had finished building a large Aluminum Melting Plant in Saudasjøen, but the production was moved to Årdal in 1946. The remaining buildings were demolished by the municipality in the 1950s, leaving the industrial area in Saudasjøen empty for decades. In the 1980s, a glass production factory was established together with a couple of mechanic production factories. The population of Sauda reached its peak in the mid-1960s, approximately 6,700 inhabitants. In 1998, the urban area of Sauda was declared to be a town (mostly a symbolic name, with no new municipal authority).

Geography
Sauda is located in the valleys and mountains surrounding the Saudafjorden. Outside of the main valley, most of the municipality is very mountainous terrain, with mountains like Skaulen and Kyrkjenuten. The town of Sauda is located about two hours by boat from the city of Stavanger, about three hours by car from the city of Bergen, and about five hours by car from the national capital, Oslo. The mountains surrounding the village of Saudasjøen contain one of the biggest ski resorts on the west coast of Norway. The town of Sauda is located on flat land, a delta created by the rivers that empty into the fjord just outside the town centre.

Climate
Sauda has something in between a humid continental climate (Dfb) and a temperate oceanic climate (Cfb). Situated at the innermost part of the long and narrow Saudafjord, the oceanic influences are less than in Stavanger, but still enough to moderate winters. Atlantic lows coming from the west goes up against the mountains surrounding Sauda and the result is a large amount of precipitation. The wettest part of the year is late autumn and winter and the driest season is spring and early summer, which demonstrates an oceanic precipitation pattern. The weather station in Sauda has been operating since March 1928. The all-time high temperature  was recorded July 2019, and the record low  was set in January 2010 (extremes available back to 2003).The average date for the first overnight freeze (below ) in autumn is October 15 (1981-2010 average).

Government
All municipalities in Norway, including Sauda, are responsible for primary education (through 10th grade), outpatient health services, senior citizen services, unemployment and other social services, zoning, economic development, and municipal roads. The municipality is governed by a municipal council of elected representatives, which in turn elect a mayor.  The municipality falls under the Haugaland og Sunnhordland District Court and the Gulating Court of Appeal.

Municipal council
The municipal council of Sauda is made up of 19 representatives that are elected to four year terms. Currently, the party breakdown is as follows:

Economy
The main activity is industry, with large companies represented like Eramet, Saint-Gobain, Statkraft, Sauda Building Center, Statnett, Elkem, and Effektivt Renhold

Tourism

Sauda has a well-developed nightlife, which is suited for all adult ages. There are young-adult bars, as well as more mature-adult bars accessible. A movie theater, many tourist attractions, and restaurants exist as a way of relaxing after skiing. However, the most highly recommended first stop is the après-ski at Sauda Skisenter. Also notable athletes, alpine racers, and summer-winter athletes call Sauda home.

Attractions
 Rondahaugen – with views over the city and out towards Stavanger
 Sauda Church, Solbrekk Chapel, Hellandsbygd Chapel, and Saudasjøen Chapel – local churches
 Allmannajuvet – old mines with guided tour
 Sauda Smelteverk –  melting plant that is still active, guided tour after appointment
 Nordag – former aluminium melting plant in Saudasjøen
 Old Graveyard in Saudasjøen – containing tombs of Russian POWs who died when building the Nordag aluminium melting plant during World War II
 Tveittunet in Saudasjøen – old refurbished estate in Saudasjøen

 Jonegarden på Hustveit  –  old refurbished farm and a lumber mill
 Løyning – old farm about 10 kilometers away from Sauda
 Risvoldtunet – food service, conference center, guided tour on a mini power plant
 Åbøbyen – best conserved North-American styled village area in Norway
 Honganvikfossen – a waterfall
 Svandalsfossen – a waterfall
 Jetegrytene in Åbødalen – rivers and waterfalls
 Sauda museum – collection in downtown Sauda featuring local heritage
 Industriarbeidermuseet – museum about the life of local workmen (1920s to 1950s)
 Fagerheimsaminga – exhibition of carved wooden figures in Saudahallen
 City walk – arrangement in summer time with a guided tour through the city of Sauda
 City center – during winter, heated streets are free of snow

Notable residents

 Jakob Aano (1920–2016) politician, Member of the Parliament of Norway
 Paul Engstad (1926–2012) a Norwegian politician, journalist and author
 Hans Frette (1927–1989) politician, local Mayor & Member of the Parliament of Norway
 Dr. Arne Fjørtoft (born 1937) a Norwegian politician, journalist and author
 Odd Bondevik (1941–2014) Bishop of the Diocese of Møre in the Church of Norway
 Kjartan Fløgstad (born 1944) author, associated with magic realism in Norway
 Svein Mathisen (1952–2011) footballer with 329 club caps and 25 for Norway
 Bjørn Eidsvåg (born 1954) a pop singer, songwriter and ordained Lutheran minister
 Torfinn Opheim (born 1961) former mayor and member of the Parliament of Norway
 Hildeborg Juvet Hugdal, (Norwegian Wiki) (born 1983) powerlifter, the World's Strongest Woman

Twin towns — sister cities
Sauda has sister city agreements with the following places:
 San Juan del Sur, Nicaragua

References

Further reading

External links

Municipal fact sheet from Statistics Norway 

 
Municipalities of Rogaland
1842 establishments in Norway